Ebrahim Hajiani (born 1967) is an Iranian sociologist whose work focuses on futures studies, identity, sociology of religion and secularism.
He is the deputy head of the Iranian Center for Strategic Studies and a former head of Iranian Students Polling Agency.

Books
 The Sociology of Morality, Tehran: Jameshenasan
 Approaches to Moderation Discourse, Tehran: Negah-e Moaser
 Sociological Meditations on Secularism, Tehran: ACECR
 The Bases, Principles and Methods in Future Studies, Tehran: Imam Sadiq University
 Lifestyle Models in Iran, Tehran: Center for Strategic Research

References

External links
 Hajiani's Articles

Living people
Iranian sociologists
Tarbiat Modares University alumni
University of Tabriz alumni
University of Tehran alumni
1967 births
Academic staff of Shahed University
Sociologists of religion